The Riddles of Epsilon is a young adult or teenage fantasy novel by the British author Christine Morton-Shaw. It was first published in the USA by the Katherine Teegan imprint of Harper Collins publishers (April, 2005). It later appeared in the UK (October, 2005) and Italy (February, 2006).

Review
Jess is a 14-year-old teenager who gets expelled from her school due to her increasing ill-disciplined actions. It becomes one of the main reasons why her parents decide to move to Lume, a remote island, where her mother had inherited acres of land. Her mother is a painter, and her father, a photographer searching for his lucky break. She has no friends apart from her dog, Domino, to keep her company so in a very short span of time she becomes very bored and tired of the island and begins roaming around it, discovering new things.
	It so happened that one day she was chatting away on her laptop with her old friend, Avril, when suddenly a character named ‘V’ entered the chat room and began chatting with her. At first, she deduced that it must be an amateur hacker trying to annoy her, but soon she got completely freaked out when she learned that the intruders’ messages were not visible to Avril. ‘V’ conceals his identity and remains anonymous. What’s even weirder is that upon checking, the security system showed that only Avril and Jess were in the chatroom, and ‘V’s’ chat had disappeared as if by magic. 
	The days pass, and Jess finds herself increasingly frustrated by the boredom of the environment she’s in. Like every day, she wanders off exploring the island, only this time, she’s finally found a place she finds to be extremely intriguing. It’s a tiny cottage, in a small clearing in the middle of the trees. She feels the stillness of the remote place and it seems to her as if the house is observing her with the windows as its eyes. She can feel the eeriness as she reaches the front door, and upon looking below discovers some markings on the doorstep. She scrapes away the leaves and can make out some symbols molded into the doorstep. She can’t make out what the symbols mean but below them is written:
“WHERE _ _ SILON DWELLS”
	She nudges on the door and pushes hard to open it, and in doing so notices the figure of a tall, dark man staring at her from the corner of the room. She blinks, and he’s gone and there’s only a coat hanging on a rocking chair. As she begins to inspect the elements of the room, she feels some sort of uneasiness that doesn’t want here there, and she almost jumps out of her skin when she turns around and sees the rocking chair moving and rushes out of the cottage as fast as she can. She keeps running for a bit until she’s sure she’s gotten away from the eerie place and settles herself upon a tree stump. She looks up and sees another tree, but it’s marked with an arrow pointing downwards to the ground. Her curiosity gets the better of her as she begins digging away and the ground eventually gives way to reveal…. a bucket. 
	The bucket is empty and engraved on its bottom is a symbol like a feather toppled over and reads Epsilon. She’s telling her friend, Avril, about her recent experiences when suddenly ‘V’ enters the chatroom once again. When asked what the ‘V’ means, she’s told: “V is a letter that is not a letter”. It is then that the mysterious ‘V’ tells her to put the bucket in the windowsill at sunset. 
	What happens next is even weirder, as Jess saw what she thought was some sort of a reflection on the wall, and it turned out to be coming from the bucket, even though there were no shiny or reflective objects within it. Nonetheless, she copied what were 37 symbols reflected upon the wall from the bucket. She was pondering over what it could be when ‘V’ texts Jess to translate the symbols from the wall, by comparing them to those she found at the doorstep of the cottage. As guided, the next day she goes up for a closer inspection of the doorstep and begins comparing what’s written to what symbols she’d observed the other day. Slowly but surely, she begins to decipher the message she could see through the symbols reflected on her wall the previous day. It takes her hours, but she finally figures out the squiggly symbols and interprets them to be as follows:
“WITH A MIRRORED DREAM
A FOLLOWED SOUND
THUS LET IT BEGIN”
	She can hear her mother calling her from the edge of the stairs to give her a belemnite, a tiny shell she’d found on the beach, some weird fossil that she has no idea what good will ever do to her, as she finishes up her diary for that day.
	 Something very strange has happened. Jess wakes up from a dream at five in the morning. She turns on her globe lamp and has the sudden urge to draw and write what she saw and begins doings so. She dreamt of a boy, sitting on a bed; the same bed as hers, who worriedly began writing or drawing on a piece of paper with a quill pen. She could hear a distant flute and it was as if she and this boy were both attracted by it. The boy quickly finished whatever he was writing and looked out of the window, and hurriedly began running towards the sound of the flute. It was coming from the woods, could it be from the cottage? As the boy ran faster, the sound of the flute began to get fainter and fainter, and that was all she could remember. She didn’t understand why, but she felt a need to write all this down as quickly as possible. As she got done with her writing, she noticed that the distant flute noise was real, and even though it wasn’t very loud, yet it was very insistent. She could tell where it was coming from and began moving towards the origin of the sound. She went and went until she was at the cottage. The sun had risen a bit, and the birds were chirping, yet the flute’s sound was rhythmically in her head. She could see the door of the cottage was closed, even though she’d left it open a couple of days ago. As she opened the door, the flutes’ music came to an abrupt halt, and she could seemingly see it fall, mid-air. She picked it up and saw the toppled-leaf sign engraved on its mouthpiece. It was full of dust, as if it hadn’t been touched in a hundred years, yet when she tried to blow it, there came no sound. Instead, out fell a crippled, yellowed page. She began to unfold the paper and saw to her amazement the drawing of a girl in a bed – she could tell it was the same bed as hers by looking at the swans carved in it – until she realized…. it was her.
	In awe, she turned the drawing over and read what was written. It was written by a boy named Sebastian Wren, in the year 1894. It read that he’d dreamt of a girl who woke up in the same bed as his, and this girl reached her hand out in the dark only to find a tiny world light up in her hand. This girl then wrote down with a pen that had endless ink and never needed an inkwell to work. He could see that the girl drew and wrote something down, and then went scurrying off into the woods. Jess now understood that this girl that Sebastian was talking of was her, and the riddle began to make sense. She concluded that the ‘followed sound’ was that of a flute, and that ‘a mirrored dream’ was what she and that boy had just seen.  
	For the next few days, Jess was sick; so sick that they had to call in a doctor to have her checked for food poisoning. Dr. Parker seemed like a nice guy, flustery like most doctors. Luckily, Jess did not have food poisoning, but it was clear that she was taking some stress, so the doctor asked her to open-up a bit more. Looking into his seemingly deep eyes, Jess felt that she could trust him and so all her problems began pouring out. She told him how tired she was of being alone in that godforsaken island, how she missed her friends, the marital issues going on between her parents and a lot more. It was then that the doctor went up to the windowsill and examined the bucket. For some reason, Jess didn’t want him to see what was on its bottom, as the doctor sighed what was written; “Epsilon”, and asked Jess if she had any idea what it meant. She said she didn’t and as the doctor put It back, he invited her to an annual festival, “The Greet”, that was to happen in a fortnight. Once the doctor had left, Jess checked the underside of the bucket only to see that the toppled-feather symbol and the word ‘Epsilon’ was no longer there.
	She opens her laptop and tells ‘V’ that she’s figured out who he is, that she’s solved the riddle of his name, and addresses him as Epsilon. Epsilon then tells her that she must hurry and that her mother’s life is in danger. Jess gets confused but Epsilon advises her to remain focused and go back to the cottage and search for Sebastian. 
	Later, Jess goes back to the cottage and begins exploring for any signs. The house was caved in from most places, but the rooms seemed to have a safe feel to them. There were various pots and pans all around and many charts and constellations drawn on the walls. She was going through the contents of a drawer when she saw some papers, but it was almost as if she couldn’t touch them even if she wanted to. Suddenly, she could feel another presence in the room and the hair on her neck stood up. She turned around dreading the worst and there he was. She could see the long, black coat and those white, stony eyes. She blinked and all she could see was her own reflection in the mirror. She tried to calm herself and continued her search until she found three identical boxes in one of the drawers, with a key next to them. The key easily fit all the boxes, but it would only open one. As she took out the contents of the box, she felt as if a hand was being reached out through the years, they were Sebastian’s notes. She settled herself on the hammock and began reading. 
	In his diary, Sebastian had mentioned how Epsilon keeps telling him to write down all the happenings going around him, he refers to Jess as ‘the girl with the world in her hands’ and begins telling how his mama has begun reacting strangely; how she doesn’t talk much to anyone, and there’s always a lost look on her face. She wanders off to the beach everyday only to gather many hundreds of shells and dumps them all in the garden. Epsilon keeps telling him too that his mama is in danger, and much like Jess’ time, the people of the island are also preparing for ‘the greet’. Sebastian also mentions how he heard Master Cork sing the poem: ‘the Ballad of Yolande’, while carving the Coscoroba pole for the Aroundy dance. The last part of the box contained a page labelled as ‘the key’, but it was written in symbols which she managed to interpret easily – another riddle. He also mentioned a hint that Epsilon gave him to solve the poem: ‘V then V then V’. Jess is a little frightened by the similarities of the events but drifts off to sleep before she can think of anything else, hearing the wings of a bird, flapping strongly outside.
	Avril doesn’t believe a word of what Jess is saying anymore and thinks she’s lost her mind. Jess begins asking Epsilon questions about everything that is in her mind. He says he must talk in riddles so that no one else from the ‘other side’ can understand them. He says that he still lives in the cottage but there is never any trace because the rules of this world do not apply to him. He continues telling her how he wanted her to find the bucket and that it was he who rocked the chair to scare her, so she would run in the direction of the bucket. When Jess asks how the bucket made of solid wood could reflect anything, he answers the same that she is not dealing with something that follows the rules of this Earth.
	Jess begins noticing her mum carefully. She too doesn’t talk that much anymore and is constantly sighing; apart from that she’s been drawing a painting of a woman repeatedly. Jess is helping her father prepare for the greet when her mum enters the house with a shopping bag and empties all its contents in the garden - shells. The next day, she remembers that Epsilon had asked her to crack the code from the poem. It was a beautiful poem, and she’d read it over and over but couldn’t understand what she was supposed to do – until it hit her. ‘V then V then V’ meant she was to count every fifth word of the poem and voila; she’d cracked it. Suddenly, she realized the poem was not so beautiful anymore – rather it had an evil kick to it. 
Later that night, as she is getting some snacks from the kitchen, she notices a constant hum that is slowly moving away. She looks out and sees her mum humming to the tune of the poem and slowly walking away from the house. She begins trailing after her until they reach a tower. The tower is seemingly useless as it has no entrance doors or windows, just four gargoyles carved in each direction. As she nears the tower, she can hear other chants coming from within, saying evil things and suddenly her mother stops. Jess goes closer to her and realizes that she is sleepwalking – and suddenly upon hearing the horrific words of the chants, her mother yells loudly, and the chants cease. She gets scared and tries to rush her mother into leaving that place but as they are retreating, they get caught up by two people – Dr. Parker and his friend, Ely, who say they were fishing when they heard her. They bring her mum back home and give her some tranquilizers.
	Once they’d brought her Mum back inside, Jess began asking the doctor and his friend suspicious questions, because she didn’t believe their explanations, but they merely shrugged them off. Jess couldn’t sleep much that night and woke up early to go off and open the second box in Epsilon’s drawer. As she opened the second box, she could see Sebastian’s scribbly writing and some pages from some article. In his notes, Sebastian had explained that he felt his father and mother were both losing their minds and that Epsilon wanted him to investigate the history of the island. So, he went to his library and found some old books on Lume. 
	In the books, there was a brief history of the island of Lume, and that it once had a great, beautiful and mighty king, King Lume, whom everyone loved because of the beautiful songs that he played (the Lumic). The King began adoring one of his subjects and made him his prince and bestowed upon him a part of his beauty. Not too long later, the prince turned against the king and began making music – evil music. He began gathering followers and challenged the king. He protested that there should be a new king chosen, and so all the people chose their sides. Everyone thought that the king would at once finish off his beloved, yet what the king did was declare that the inverted law of Cimul (the prince) would never hold – that he’d never be able to steal from anyone again and the curse would never break until his tooth would be returned to him by an innocent – as after all it was his tooth that made him say such horrible things. It was then that a tooth from Cimul’s jaw fell, and as one of his followers picked it up and ran to him, it was snatched by a porpoise that jumped from the ocean. Meanwhile, as Sebastian reads all this, he gets scared while hearing faint sounds of someone walking outside his door, but the page ends as he is about to reveal what’s scaring him behind the door.
	Jess goes home, only to notice that her mothers’ behavior is getting weirder. She keeps drawing the same face everywhere; the face of a forlorn looking woman staring into the distance. What’s more, she’s even begun bringing more and more shells from the beach; and that’s when it hits her – what does the ocean wash away? Shells – what if the ocean had also brought to shore the jaw of Cimul? Epsilon tells her to stay vigilant and go back to the cottage to see a portrait. As she goes to the cottage, she searches for a circular portrait in a square frame. She finds a golden circle with a black background, and as she turns it over, there’s an image labelled ‘the Ouroborus’ which is an incomplete circle in the form of an ‘O’ where a snake is eating its own tail. She feels a chill down her spine as she feels the presence of Epsilon and she can see him as she turns back. Nothing but a glimpse of dark shadows moving like mist, but with crystal, glary eyes. It is then that Epsilon talks in front of her and tells her that her father is at the lake taking a picture that she must see, and that her mother is drawing a picture she must find. Scared out of her mind, she cries while running home, all the while wondering whether Epsilon could be trusted.  
	Jess pondered and remembered what Epsilon had asked her to do earlier – she was to look for a map of the island which she found in one of the books Sebastian had picked. As she opened the book, out fell two ageing pages: one a map and the second a letter to Sebastian from his mama. In the letter, Sebastian’s mama wrote that she felt that her time was nearing; that either she’d be sent to an asylum or that she’d be going far away from her son’s eyes. She said she knew how she’d been acting strangely but couldn’t explain the situation to anyone, and that he shouldn’t worry anymore for her and forget about her. It seemed she was bidding farewell to her son by telling him that he’d be the sole inheritor of all she owned, including the house. 
	Next, she remembered she had to check her mothers’ paintings, there were two. On one, there was the tower that her mother had sleepwalked to, and on the other was a woman stretching her arms out into a ‘V’, faced towards a castle. Then, she went on to check her fathers’ roll films and she got scared by what she saw. At first there were just pictures of a black swan flying, resting, eating. Until suddenly, she saw in the final image that the swan had opened its wings out wide, in front of a castle; but surely a swan couldn’t be that big? Gulping, she realized that the picture and what her mother had drawn were the same things. A wave of fear ran through her body. 
	The day of the Greet was nearing, and all the villagers were playing their part during preparations. Jess’s mother gave her some fish and prawns to give to Dr. Parker since he was the one storing the supplies for the Greet. So off she went on her bicycle, towards the doctor’s house. She attempted to take a shortcut following the map she’d taken from the library and found her father still picturing the black swan near the beach. Steps – too late. Before she could react, she was sent down a flight of steps which she could barely make out; they were so overgrown with moss. As she got up, she had an odd feeling of Deja-vu. It was the same place her mother had drawn, and her father pictured in his film. Slowly, she got up and looked at the map and then noticed two paths emerging from where she was. As she scraped away the moss, she could see a few lines written mentioning ‘the ONE LADY’. It was the same writing her mother had written in her portrait. It didn’t take her long to make out that it was an anagram for ‘Yolande’. As she said the name out aloud, she felt a stillness in the place. As she looked around, she found a tiny set of eyes peering at her through the bushes, and as she screamed, away flew the black swan. She rushed back to the main track and found her way to doctor’s, white as a sheet. 
	Once she’d delivered the goods, the doctor offered to drop her off; seeing the condition her bike was in, once he’d be done seeing some villagers. One of the houses they went to was of an old woman named Mrs. Shilling. As wrinkled and smelly as she was, her house was even more - just bigger. Portraits of all types of birds hung from the walls and as the doctor went away for a while, the woman gave Jess a stern look and asked her whether she’d found it. Jess was confused by what she meant. Mrs. Shilling tutted, got up and brought a wrinkled portrait of a bird and place it in Jess’s hands, and told her to pretend it’s a boy. Jess thought the woman had lost her head and kindly nodded and went back to sit in the doctor’s car. She fell asleep before she could remember anything, and the doctor woke her as they reached her home. As she was going inside, the doctor told her that she’d dropped something, the picture of the bird. Before handing it over, he gave it a thorough look, turned it over and read something with a frown, and handed it to Jess. Before he left, the doctor advised Jess to not meddle her mind in the history of the island, after all it was just legend and stories. Confused, Jess turned around to her home and as she walked, gave the picture a good look. It was a tiny looking bird, and on the back, it said: “Latin: TROGLODYTES TROGLODYTES. Common name: Wren.” What had Mrs. Shilling said? Pretend it’s a boy. Her face grew pale. 
	Epsilon had beckoned for Jess to go back and fill the final piece of the jigsaw after opening the third box. Inside the third box were Sebastian’s diary pages, a letter from his mama, and a newspaper cutting. In the diary pages, the story of what lay behind the door continued. Sebastian slowly opened the door, only to see that it was his mother, laying shells. It seemed as if she was lighting a path for someone. He tried to take his mother back to her bedchamber and was told that he must now pick up the shells, by his infuriated father. It took him ages to do that as the shells were set all around the entire house. However, in his own room, Sebastian saw that the shells were arranged in a specific order, and he noted it down before gathering them. But once he was done, he went back to his mother and saw that next to her head was a black feather. After reading his diary pages, Jess read his mama, Martha’s letter to Sebastian. It was a very sad letter in which his mama had mentioned how she would soon go away but that Sebastian mustn’t follow where she goes – that he must forget about her and move on. She stated that Sebastian was being misled by a dark being, who was filling his mind with riddles and lies, such as saying that a deadly eagle could be more beautiful than a harmless, swift swan. Before ending her letter, she mentioned that there was a hidden space behind one of the swans carved by Master Cork. Next came the newspaper cutting, whose title shook Jess. It stated that a woman had mysteriously disappeared at a community gathering on the island, and that she’d been presumed dead after search parties gave up. 
	Jess was absorbing all she’d just learnt when she saw that her reflection in the mirror was no longer hers, as two faceted eyes had appeared. She shrieked with fear as Epsilon took out his flute and began playing a tune, which seemed to calm her. Once calmed, Epsilon tried to explain to Jess by showing her what had happened over time, looking in the window – how Cimul had cursed that if he possessed the tooth, he’d use it for evil, and how King Lume had said he had to possess it through the hands of an innocent. Next, the window showed Jess’s mum picking shells at the beach and behind her Martha Wren and the line of women continued. They were all searching for the relic. He explained how the bright beings wanted to remove the curses by possessing the relic and how the dark ones wanted to use it for evil. He told Jess how Sebastian got scared and got rid of everything, how he continued his life searching for his mama forever, until he died. He told Jess how every female member of the big house had gone through what her mother was going through now, and that every masculine owner of the house had sided with the dark beings. It turned out that Sebastian was the great great-grandfather of Jess and had removed the curse from the big house by writing in his will that the house will only be passed down to a female member of the family.
     	Jess got up in the middle of the night worrying about the final clue, only to see that there was something odd happening outside. As she peered through her bedroom window, she could see her mother laying down shells. She was amazed by what else she saw – a great white eagle with its deadly talons, half the size of a person, standing in front of his mother, yet she paid no heed and kept laying the shells. Suddenly, a flash of bright light shone, and the eagle flew away. Out came her father, staring in awe at her mother who he couldn’t believe was unable to see the huge specimen that was just in front of her. Instead, she plainly said how she’d lit ‘her’ way and that ‘she’ could come now. 
	The day of the Greet has arrived, and people have begun gathering at the beach. Jess is still trying her utmost to figure out the final clue. Children are playing their games and Jess is distributing lemonade with Mrs. Shilling, who she notices keeps on giving her mean looks and is constantly tutting under her breath. Jess meets many new people including the man who carved the Coscoroba pole for the dance, Jerry Cork, which was to be held later at midnight. He suddenly begins talking to Jess separately and advises her that she is being led astray by a dark being pretending to be a bright being. That she is being fooled by his riddles and that she mustn’t pay any heed to such stuff. Jess is left stunned and in awe but excuses the old man. 
The children are singing poems and telling stories to each other, and Jess goes and sits in a group of where Mrs. Shilling is also present. Upon Jess’s arrival, Mrs. Shilling begins telling a story of a stupid girl who’s task it is to find treasure under a rock; yet she keeps looking under white and black rocks when what she really needs is to look under a black and white rock. All the kids become confused as Mrs. Shilling is telling the story and in the meanwhile is also drawing something on the ground. No one gets the point of the story and Mrs. Shilling tells them off by saying they should go to bed, specifically directing it at Jess. It isn’t until everyone is gone that Jess looks at the pattern Mrs. Shilling has drawn – it’s the same one as the one Sebastian described his mama had drawn in his room, the same pattern drawn in the cottage too. Suddenly, she remembers what Martha had said to Sebastian about the space behind the swan. She runs to her house. 
	She finds the correct swan easily and it opens to reveal a piece of paper, obviously written by Sebastian, but in symbols. She interprets the symbols to reveal yet another riddle. She returns to the beach wondering where her mother is, when she catches her wandering off and brings her back to sit alongside Mrs. Shilling and some children who are singing old melodies and poems. They sing different poems including one about Yolande, and that she brings five feathers wherever she goes. Her mother moves over to the larger campfire in search for food as the people begin chanting different songs. They drink cheers to everything they can think of as Jess finds a space next to Mrs. Shilling and asks her for help. Mrs. Shilling again explains to her that she must put the black rocks on top of the whites and that is when it hits her. She must place the patterns over the map of the island. She only begins pondering over what has just occurred to her that she is left astonished by what she sees - hundreds of swans flying over the beach, and as she began counting the feathers that fell here and there, she couldn’t see more than five. She shudders as her father is running around with his cameras in delight and barely pays attention when she asks where her mother has gone to, for she is nowhere to be seen. 
	No one had seen her mother for some time now and they all decide to go to Dr. Parker’s to plan a search party for her. Jess manages to slip past their eyes before anyone could see where she was going; she was headed to her house to solve the final clue. She rushed into her room and lay all the riddles and clues in front of her. Now that she looked at the patterns closely, she deduced that they must be constellations pointing towards something on the map of the island. The final clue that she’d found indirectly referred to aligning the constellations on the map correctly, she realized. Once she’d aligned the two patterns correctly, she saw that both pointed towards two wells – one at the tip of each of the constellations. The nearest one was close to the cottage, not far from where she was. She took her backpack and torch and set off with Domino.
	The opening of the well was so small that she missed it at first. It wasn’t until Domino disappeared for a second that she could see the tiny opening through which he’d gone. Following him, she entered and after shining her flashlight around, saw a series of spiraled steps. As she went on, a lot of thoughts began entering her mind – where was her mother? Was she okay? What if Epsilon was a dark being? The silence of the well was playing tricks on her mind, until she reached the bottom and could hear a faint gushing sound. She went forth and found a cave that had its opening facing the sea. The tide must fill the entire cave when it’d come, and thinking this, she knew at once she must be quick. As she shone the torch around, she noticed a tiny hand pointing towards something which she could now see was the source of the gushing sound. It was a small opening in the cave which kept on getting filled with water, and then the air pressure coming from the other side would cause it to overflow, thus producing a constant gushing sound. The opening was barely big in enough for her hand and she had to put her whole arm through to find what she felt was something round, small and smooth. She fumbled her hand but managed to pull it out before it filled with water again, and without having a look at what it was, ran.
	Ran past the cave and its spiral steps until she’d finally come out of the well’s entrance. Once she was out, she shone her torch at what she’d found – a piece of paper. She knew whatever it was would be some sort of a map to guide her towards finding the tooth, but she was left with shock as she unraveled the paper. It was nothing but an oval, inside of which was a shrewdly drawn arrow. She became blank – she had no idea what this meant and began crying. All this suffering for nothing but an arrow? She hated everything just then – the arrow, Epsilon, the island and everything on it. She cried as she ran back to her home but saw Domino running towards the cottage instead. She didn’t want to go there, but she had to get Domino, and behind him she went. She got tired of running and rested for a bit when suddenly something struck her mind – but it surely couldn’t be, could it? She rushed towards the cottage, past it, and went towards where she’d buried the bucket; the same place where she remembered seeing another arrow. Once there, she compared the two arrows – they were the same. She began digging ferociously in the mud, which was much softer than the last time she’d dug it. 
	She took out the bucket and emptied its contents. Out came all her ‘treasures’ – nothing but meaningful pieces that she’d put in the bucket: her grandma’s jet necklace, an old photo of hers taken by her dad, the belemnite her mother had given her, a hidden pack of cigarettes – nothing else. Tired of going around in circles, she began crying leaning against the tree when she noticed something. From the cottage she could see an electric light shining. She rushed inside to see her laptop screen glowing.
	Epsilon texted, urging her to bring the relic she’d found to the other cave. Astounded, she exclaimed that she did not have the relic even though Epsilon inferred that she had. He told her that her mother was waiting for her in the other cave, the cave shown by the second constellation, and so was Yolande. She couldn’t understand what Epsilon was talking about and asked him to explain, to which Epsilon replied that she must bring ‘the only thing found in Lume’. Confused out of her mind, she went back to the bucket and carefully assessed its contents. ‘The only thing found on Lume’ – what do you find on an island surrounded by the sea? – Shells. She stared at the belemnite her mother had brought her, saying how it resembled a baby stone carrot. She now realized that it was nothing of the sort. It was shaped like a sharp incisor tooth, with centuries of old crustaceans filled all over its edges. She put it in her pocket and ran. As she ran, she could see a tiny speck in the clear night sky – a bird - a black swan. 
	Jess had reached the point on the beach where the cave was supposed to be; from the map it seemed like somewhere around the Coscoroba rock. It took her a while to find a tiny opening but surely that couldn’t be it. She had to lift herself a few meters and fit inside a tiny space under the rock, and she found herself surrounded with rocks as she shone her torch around. She found a narrow moonlit passageway up ahead and followed the light for a bit, until the passageway ended, and she could see tiny spiral steps emerging from the walls. As she shone her torch around, she saw four identical figures extruding from the wall – she was inside the Miradel that overlooked the island, and the figures were the four gargoyles. Slowly, she crept down the steps and could hear in the distance a constant flow of falling water. At the bottom of the steps was what seemed to be a wide cavern, and she could see a small waterfall coming down from the rocks. She looked down and saw some stones neatly placed in the middle of the tiny pond that had formed. What really surprised her, however, was that on each stone sat a white swan that was insistently staring at her. It was then that a bright light glowed from behind the waterfall.
	Slowly, the light became lesser and began to take the shape of a woman. It was the most beautiful woman Jess had ever seen, wearing a glimmering silvery grey dress. She welcomed Jess and referred to herself as Yolande – at this Jess began hearing the tune of ‘the ballad of Yolande’ echoing around the cave. Yolande told Jess that she was a bright being and that she’d come for the relic, that she’d save her mother with the relic if Jess gave it to her. Behind Yolande, Jess could make out something wrapped around a dark cloth, and to the left she could see her mother, cradled up - but she wouldn’t respond. Yolande insisted that her mother was in a deep sleep and only the relic could save her. As Jess stepped on the stones, each swan slowly glided into the water, with their eyes still fixed on Jess. 
	Suddenly, Jess could feel a crackling energy, and to the side appeared a tall, dark man – Epsilon. Epsilon told Jess to not give her mother the relic, as she would hand it over to Yolande who was a dark being. Instead, he asked of her to break it by smashing it against the wall. Yolande shone her light towards Epsilon, and Jess got to see him clearly. He was not wearing a dark robe – rather he was wearing a scarlet-red colored dress, the color of blood, and from his waist hung deadly weapons. At that moment, Jess felt that Epsilon was a dark being trying to lead her astray. At the same time, as Jess looked around, she saw that on the same stone as hers stood a boy, Sebastian. He beckoned for Jess to hand over the relic to Yolande, to save her mother. He tugged at her hand, almost trying to take the relic out of it. Epsilon warned Jess that this was not Sebastian; rather it was an embodiment of a dark being, faking to be him. Jess looked around and saw that each swan was wearing an ouroboros necklace. She asked Sebastian the name of the One who Epsilon worked for, after all he had mentioned the name quite a few times in his letters. It was a word that gave him strength but suddenly he looked unable to say it anymore. Epsilon smiled and Jess yelled the name – Agapetos! The dark being embodying Sebastian disappeared at once. It was clear in her head now, that Yolande was a dark being because she summoned a fake Sebastian, that Epsilon was right all along. Epsilon again asked Jess to break the relic, but she knew she couldn’t – she had to save her mum. 
	She stepped past the waterfall and wrapped her hands around her mother – she didn’t respond and felt as cold as ice. However, she opened her eyes at once, once Jess placed the relic in her hands. Struggling to get to her feet, Jess tried to make her see reason to not give the relic to Yolande, for she would use it to invoke curses of great evil. However, her mother continued walking towards Yolande, telling them how she saw her face every day, everywhere she went. How she beckoned her even in her dreams. Her sad face longing to find something in the sea. Yolande’s eyes filled with greed and made a fake smile while nodding to her mother, as she beckoned for her to now hand over the relic. But to everyone’s astonishment, her mother went past Yolande, over to the pile of cloth cradled on the floor. Jess could now see that it wasn’t a bundle of cloth, rather it was the remains of a person who lived long ago. Her mother bent over and opened the hands of the woman hidden under the cloth, the hands which were nothing more than bones now. She looked at the woman’s locket and opened it to find a picture of Sebastian and his mama. Furious with rage, she turned around and screamed at Yolande that she was ruthless in leaving the poor soul to die in the cold, just because she couldn’t find the tiny relic? 
	The beautiful face had now changed – it had become a face of greed, for all Yolande now wanted was the relic. As she began forcefully reaching out for it, suddenly from behind Epsilon shone the brightest white light. It was in fact so bright that it couldn’t be looked at and made Yolande’s light seem dull and ugly. Epsilon turned around and kneeled towards the light, as strong, magnificent music echoed throughout the cave. It was then that a majestic voice spoke that the plan was unfolding as it was supposed to. It called out Yolande, saying that she’d told lies to the child in front of her. A lie that she welcomed her into the cave, when she intended for it to be her tomb – a lie that she would use the relic for great purposes when she only possessed evil – a lie that her name was Yolande when it was Cimul! A loud voice bellowed around the cave and ordered Cimul to be present in his real form. 
	At once, the woman began changing. The flowers hanging from her neck and wrists became the ouroborus – the snake eating its own tail. Its clothes changed to a disgusting red like that of old blood, and a rotten smell emerged from it. Horrible songs of the inverted rule echoed around the cave, only to be engulfed by the powerful, majestic music coming from the other end. Cimul beckoned for Jess’s mother to hand over the relic, for it would now the serve the purpose it had to, while the other being agreed. The being said that the relic was in the right hands and that those hands would not fail him now. Shivering, Jess’s mother stretched out an arm towards Agapetos. Cimul let out a horrible cry and summoned his faithful ones. Suddenly, the entire place filled with hundreds of swans and evil chants arose. As Jess looked over, she could see that there was no longer a person standing where Cimul did – rather the huge wings of a great black swan emerged. A great black swan with vile, vicious, red eyes.
	The swans flew up to the cavern and turned around, led by the black swan, and aimed to snatch the relic from Jess’s mothers outreached hand. On the other hand, Agapetos was no longer the source of bright illumination, rather a majestic eagle stood, beaming with white light. The eagle soared and cleanly swept the relic from her mother’s hand in its talons. As it tried to go through the cluster of swans, it couldn’t manage to set itself free from the crowd of swans surrounding it. Suddenly a brilliant white light gleamed, and all the swans were on the ground in an instant, as Jess held her mother to find cover. It was then that the eagle beckoned for Cimul to come alone and take possession of the relic. Suddenly, a black swan emerged from the masses of the whites, its eyes full of greed, and the swan changed to Cimul’s actual form as he grasped his hands around the talons of the eagle. It was then that Agapetos yelled that he revokes the curse, and that whoever possesses the tooth may now only use it for blessings, and that all curses were now removed. Cimul shrieks as a streak of intense bright light shines through the cavern. 
	Suddenly, a crack begins opening in the walls, and Jess can feel the entire structure about to collapse. Epsilon orders her to take her mother and run away from the cave. As they scamper away to the entrance of the cave, Jess notices that both the swan and the eagle have gotten caught under the debris of the destructing structure. They run out to find one of the fires from the night before still lit and sit beside to get some warmth. Suddenly, a wave of at least a hundred swans emerges from the cave, heading far off into the horizon. Yet not one of them was black, all were white swans. Eventually, some moments later, there appeared another figure against the dark silhouette of the sky, and a final bird emerged. In its talons, it held something that shone, and as it crossed over their heads it was clear that it was the eagle. Jess and her mother both stared at the ongoings in utmost awe, as Jess explained to her mother everything she could think of and all that had happened. Her mother explained that she saw both – the face of Yolande as well as Martha, but it was Martha that she drew, she was the reason she wanted to find the relic so badly. Jess breathed a sigh of relief as she saw the eagle soar into the horizon and drop something into the ocean, caught by a jumping porpoise. 
	They met Dr Parker and Mrs. Shilling along with Ely whilst heading home. Apart from Mrs. Shilling, they both looked surprised, but deep-down Jess knew that they knew what had happened. Soon, her father entered the room with rolls of film draping around his neck. He hugged them both and told them of the images he’d just captured. Of the Miradel collapsing, and the hundreds of swans flying. The look of horror was evident on the Doctor and his friends’ face even though they tried their best to disguise it. Mrs. Shilling handed over Jess a piece of paper which she had written not long ago. Before leaving for the caves, Jess had left a hint, the riddle she found from the swan in her bed. As she turned it over, she saw three more clues that she now realized were in the first box as well, but she still couldn’t understand them. When she asked her mum, she replied that it was merely a grocery list she’d written many days ago – but how could it be? It was the same list as in the clue she’d found, written by Sebastian. She fell asleep before she could think whether she was losing her head. 
	For the next few days, both Jess and her mother had colds. Once Jess had recovered, she went off to the cottage to see how everything was going. As she put her things in place, she checked all the boxes but was surprised to see that a few of the notes and clues had seemingly disappeared. She ransacked every place she could think of but just couldn’t find them. Eventually, she gave up, thinking who else but Epsilon could have meddled with it. They were still fresh in her memory, so she began to rewrite all the things that were missing – the map, the riddle she found in her bed, the poems and the other clues. She placed them back neatly in order and went back home.
Mrs. Shilling had asked Jess and her mother to come meet her, a few days later. Neither of them understood why, yet they went to her small house. She came outside wearing her coat and holding a bag. She walked with them to the beach and plucked some flowers on the way. Once she made sure no one was in sight, she asked them to sit with her on the beach sand. She began telling them of a story about herself and her twin sister – how their father had married but then left their mother alone. She told them that her father wrote her and her sister letters, but they never read them, because they hated him for what he’d done. But she secretly read them and was fascinated by the tales of the house their father lived in, and the story of how his mother had one day vanished and that he was still looking for her. Eventually, her sister found out and broke all ties with her, so she went ahead and explored the world on her own. She couldn’t live the same complaining life her sister did. She explained that her sister was Jess’s grandmother, and that Sebastian was her father. It felt like a sad, yet happy reunion as they all hugged and then Mrs. Shilling pointed to the bag she’d brought. 
	Jess and her mother entered one last time in the cave to gather the mortal remains of Mrs. Shilling’s grandmother, Martha Wren. They picked up her bony remnants in her black blouse and placed her in the bag with the flowers, and left her for the sea, for Martha had always said that she was drawn to the sea. As the sea absorbed the bag, Jess’s mother gave Mrs. Shilling the necklace that she’d taken off Martha - the necklace that had a picture of Sebastian and his mama. Mrs. Shilling let out a wry smile as she saw her father’s face for the first time.
	 
	 Almost a year had passed since all the events had occurred. Sometimes Epsilon would talk to Jill and give her clues and riddles so she could find out more about the bright beings. Mrs. Shilling had begun to live in their house, or in her daddy’s house as she called it, constantly cleaning things and spending time with the family. One day, Jess felt the weird urge to go back and read all the documents from last year. So off she went to the cottage, emptied all the contents of the boxes only to find out that they were yellowed with age. She was dumbfounded. How could it possibly be that something she’d written as recent as a year ago, be so crippled and yellowed that it’d look more than a century old? Not unless maybe Epsilon had returned the original copies and hidden the ones she’d written. But why? Upon her calling, Epsilon appeared and smiled as she questioned him of any mischief. But he strongly denied any allegation and told Jess to look a little closely at what she was reading. After looking closely, Jess realized that the words written on the papers were the exact same as she’d written – even the style and the way she wrote her ‘t’s’ was the same. Her mind went around in circles as how could something she’d written gotten so old, so soon? Unless it wasn’t what she’d written and rather the original? Seeing her face, Epsilon nodded towards something else in the drawer. It was a final note from Sebastian’s diary.
	In his note, Sebastian had mentioned that he saw ‘girl with the world in her hands’ again in his dream, and that she opened the space in his swan bed to reveal a riddle – a riddle which he found too difficult to solve. So, he decided to give up running around in the circle of riddles, that he didn’t have the mental capacity to solve them. He said that he was scared and didn’t feel that Epsilon could be trusted anymore. Therefore, he’d put everything back away from where he’d found them, all the clues and riddles put away, and spend some more time with his mama. 
	Jess still couldn’t understand what had happened. How could Sebastian have said Jess showed her the clues, when it was in fact, he who showed them to her? - and if as Epsilon had said, the clues were written by Jess herself, then how were they over a century old, yellowed with age? These questions ran wild in her head as she stared across the room at Epsilon. His light shone towards the golden ‘O’ drawn in the frame. It was then that Jess realized what the ‘O’ meant. It was the symbol of perfection, completion and eternity. The symbol of ‘The One’. The One without beginning or end. The One to whom time was meaningless. Quivering, she stared at the golden ‘O’.

Plot
The Riddles of Epsilon focuses on the character of Jessica (‘Jess’), who moves with her mother and father to the fictional island of Lume,  far from the mainland (Scotland), after being expelled from school. While speaking to her friend Avril in an internet chatroom, Jess encounters the mysterious character of ‘V,’ Who was a ghost who begins to warn her of an impending danger, relating to Lume’s distant past. Later she dreams of a boy named Sebastian, who she realizes lived in this same house nearly one hundred years previously. As the story progresses, events in Jess’s life begin to parallel those of Sebastian’s, particularly the fact that both the children’s mothers seem to be acting incredibly strangely. Much of the exposition in the novel is handled by way of riddles and clues, which take the form of puzzles and images, through which Jess discovers, with the help of ‘V,’ the truth about the strange events taking place on Lume.

Jess, having recently moving house to the Island of Lume after being expelled from school, is talking with her friend Avril in an internet chatroom, when someone called V also appears in the chatroom, who kicks Avril out of the chatroom. He talks about her being on Lume, despite her not mentioning the name to Avril. Later, exploring the island, Jess discovers a small cottage in the forest near the "Big House", where she now lives. On the black obsidian doorstep are carved symbols and the words "WHERE _ _ SILON DWELLS". She goes into the cottage, where she thinks she sees a tall shadowy dark man standing by a rocking chair, but when she blinks, he is only an old coat with the sleeve resting on the chair. She attempts to explore the house, but then sees the rocking chair moving by itself. Terrified, she rushes out into the garden, where she discovers an arrow carved on the garden wall, pointing into the ground. She digs down at the place specified and discovers an old bucket, with a symbol like "half a feather, on its side" and the word "EPSILON" carved on its base. In the chat room that evening telling Avril about it, the mysterious V appears and tells her to put the bucket on her windowsill. Later investigating, Jess finds that she can find no trace of "V" in the chatroom history or on the print-outs of her conversations with Avril.

As V told her, she puts the bucket in her window and finds that somehow 37 symbols are projected on the walls of her room, despite there being nothing on the bucket for them to reflect off. She copies them down, and upon entering the chatroom, is told by V to use the symbols on the black doorstep at the cottage to translate them. She questions him as to how he knew the black doorstep was there, but he logs out of the chatroom. She uses the English words on the doorstep to translate the symbols from the bucket when her parents are out which turns out to be the verse,

"With a mirrored dream
A followed sound
Thus let it begin."

Before she can puzzle this out any further, her parents return from their walk, having found a "whole belemnite, whatever that is". Later that night she has a dream about a boy, sleeping in her attic bed, who wakes in the middle of the night and scribbles on a piece of paper before rushing outside, drinking from a water pump and then following the sound of a flute down towards the cottage. Jess wakes up herself, writes about her dream in her diary, before realising she too can still hear the flute music, which she follows down to the cottage. She walks in the door, and the flute music stops, the flute itself falling to the ground, as if whoever had been playing it had literally just dropped it. She picks it up, and finds it dusty and ancient, with Epsilon's symbol carved on it. She tries to blow it, and blows out a piece of paper stuck inside it. The paper is a sketch of her, sitting in her attic bed, reaching out for her globe lamp, and also a diary page written by a boy called Sebastian Wren.

The diary page is apparently what she saw Sebastian writing in her dream before he went down the cottage, and in it he talks about just having a dream himself about a girl who follows a flute down to the cottage (Jess). He talks about her nose ring being a sign of the 'Borus, which Jess does not understand, and also that Epsilon has told him to write the diary. He signs it, using the words "as Agapetos is my witness", and the date, 1894. Jess is bewildered, but realises the words a "followed sound" mean the flute music, and the "mirrored dream" is what she and Sebastian have just experienced: "I drew him, just as he looked when he woke after dreaming of me. He drew me, just as I looked when I woke from a dream about him." But she doesn't know what will now begin.

The next day Jess falls ill, and her Mum, concerned, gives her the belemnite she found, which Jess does not appreciate - ")Oh wow. A baby stone carrot. Why can't she give me a CD like other mums?)" The doctor, Dr. Parker, also comes to check her over, and tells her that it is probably just running about in the heatwave, and that even in the early mornings when she goes out she must be careful. She spills out all her woes to Dr. Parker, but feels protective when he picks up the bucket off her windowsill, and feels like something is flowing out of it. He invites her to his garden party, the Greet, next week, and leaves, but when Jess checks the bottom of the bucket again, the base is bare - Epsilon's name and symbol have gone.

In the chatroom, Jess works out that V is actually Epsilon, as he gives her the riddle "V is a letter that is not a letter". The letter V actually corresponds to the Roman numeral 5, E is the fifth letter of the alphabet, and in Greek the letter "E" is called "Epsilon". Epsilon tells her that her mother is in danger, and that she shouldn't trust Dr. Parker. He also tells her that someone evil is watching her, whom he calls the "Eye of Miradel". Jess becomes exasperated with him and leaves the chat room. She later goes down to the cottage, where she spots the tall, dark man again. She opens one of the drawers in the desk, to find 3 boxes, only the first of which she can open. In it she finds another diary page from Sebastian. He has discussed the girl he saw in his dream (Jess) with Epsilon, and the whole village is getting ready for the Greet. His mother is  behaving strangely, collecting hundreds of shells from the beach, which she has dumped in his father's hollyhocks, which has made him angry; Epsilon has warned Sebastian to look after her. He also writes down the "Ballad of Yolandë", which he has heard the carver of the may pole (or the Coscoroba), Jerry Cork, singing. Epsilon also warns him that this ballad is not all it seems and gives him the clue "V then V then V then V", which Sebastian does not understand. He has also heard his mother singing this ballad in the middle of the night, which worries him.

Jess reads the ballad and cannot understand what Epsilon means about it, as it seems perfectly innocuous. But then, in another chat Jess has had with Epsilon, when Epsilon said goodbye, E, "Or should I say V." At this she realized there were 5 V's, not four, and this is what she finds out from "The Ballad of Yolande" (every five words):

"I awake in the time of dark choices
 I stir in my wrath
 For the treasures of the deep
 Are hidden from my eyes.
 The workers of my enemy are busy. 
 I will call my faithful out
 From east, west, north and south.
 I sip weakness like nectar -
 Crush honesty to dust. 
 My bone hands bring lies and death.
 I must possess!
 My black heart sows ruin;
 To ruin is my delight.
 Mark my chanting, travellers --
 Flee from my song of beauty!"

She was appalled at this, and went on the greatest, biggest adventure of her life, to save her mother, and herself, and destroy the evil beings.

Themes
The novel deals with the ideas of good and evil found in most fantasy fiction, whilst also blurring the lines between the two and asking questions about whether evil is easy to identify. Family discord and the importance of family is another key theme, as is the importance of courage. The novel also has a preoccupation with the passage and nature of time.

Critical reception
The Riddles of Epsilon received many positive reviews on its publication in 2005. The Voice of Youth Advocates (VOYA) rated the novel as a "perfect ten" for both literary quality and "teen appeal". VOYA said of Epsilon, "this novel rises above cliché, shining through well-developed and intriguing characters, a tangible atmosphere and heart-stopping pacing." The novel was also longlisted in the UK for the Manchester Children's book awards. Those reviews criticising elements of the novel have tended to focus on its dark atmosphere, complicated plot development and the use of a diary device through which to tell the story.

References

2005 British novels
Young adult fantasy novels
British young adult novels